Arubianus or Arubinus was a Celtic god of the inscriptions in Southern Germany, and in Austria and Slovenia.

Mythology and Etymology 

The name is Celtic for "tiller" or "God of the plowed field". Sometimes it is also used for the local god of the Roman-Celtic settlement Arrubium (Măcin, Romania held), his followers would have spread his religious practices in other areas. The name may be analogous with Arawn.

In the Gallo-Roman period Arubianus was identified with the god Jupiter, so it is perhaps a sky god or father of the gods. On the other hand, Jupiter was regarded as a protective god of the Roman settlements, so that can also apply to a local deity.

See also 

 Celtic polytheism
 Celtic Mythology

Literature 

 August Friedrich von Pauly / Wissowa Georg : Pauly's Real-encyclopedia of classical archeology. Georg von Holtzbrinck Publishing Group, 1919.
 Franz Franziss: Bavaria time of the Romans: A historical-archaeological research. Friedrich Pustet, in 1905.
 Ekkehard Weber: The Roman period inscriptions Styria published by the State Historical Commission, 1969.
 Johann Wilhelm C. Steiner: Codex inscriptionum romanarum Danubii et Rheni. No. 2754.

References 

Celtic gods